Russell William Courtnall (born June 2, 1965) is a Canadian former ice hockey player. He played for the Toronto Maple Leafs, Montreal Canadiens, Minnesota North Stars, Dallas Stars, Vancouver Canucks, New York Rangers and Los Angeles Kings. Courtnall was born in Duncan, British Columbia, but grew up in Oak Bay, British Columbia.

Professional career
Courtnall was born in Duncan, British Columbia. Coming out of junior hockey, he was considered one of the top prospects in 1983 and the Toronto Maple Leafs selected him seventh overall in the 1983 NHL Entry Draft. In the 1982–83 season with the Cougars, Courtnall scored 36 goals and 61 assists for 97 points in 60 games. After being drafted by the Leafs, Courtnall appeared in just 32 games with the Cougars, scoring 29 goals and 66 points before being called up to the Maple Leafs, who were in dire need of scoring help at the time. As a rookie with Toronto, he scored 12 goals and 22 points in 69 games. Although his goal production was not as high as the Maple Leafs had hoped for, his speed opened up opportunities, especially for his linemates.

In 1984, Courtnall also suited up for the Canadian Olympic team, which finished out of the medals at the 1984 Winter Olympics. Upon returning, he rejoined the Maple Leafs. In the 1985–86 season, playing alongside fellow Notre Dame Hounds alumni Gary Leeman and rookie Wendel Clark on what was dubbed The Hound Line, Courtnall broke the 20-goal barrier, notching 22 to go along with 38 assists for 60 points. His offensive numbers improved the following year with 29 goals and 73 points.

In trying to force Courtnall to play a tougher brand of hockey, the club saw his offensive production decrease in the 1987–88 season. After just nine games into the 1988–89 season, on November 7, 1988, the Maple Leafs dealt Courtnall to the Montreal Canadiens for enforcer John Kordic. Although Courtnall's stock had clearly gone down in the eyes of Maple Leafs' management, most observers felt Montreal got a steal in that trade.

In 64 games, Courtnall put up 39 points with the Canadiens, but his fast skating and stickhandling abilities made him a fan favourite. Courtnall played strongly in the playoffs, where the Canadiens advanced to the 1989 Stanley Cup Finals where they lost to the Calgary Flames. In 21 postseason games, Courtnall contributed eight goals and 13 points.

Courtnall played for the Canadiens until 1991–92 season when on August 31, 1992, he was traded to the Minnesota North Stars for the 1992–93 season. In 84 games, he managed a career-high 36 goals and 43 assists for 79 points. He followed that up with an 80-point season in the team's first year of play in Dallas, and was selected to play in the 1994 National Hockey League All-Star Game. Late in the 1994–95 season, on April 7, 1995, Courtnall was traded to the Vancouver Canucks where he teamed up with his brother, Geoff Courtnall, for 13 games that year.

On March 8, 1997, the Canucks traded Courtnall to the New York Rangers, and on November 7, 1997, Courtnall signed as a free agent with the Los Angeles Kings, where he played until his retirement following the 1998–99 season. He finished with 297 goals, 447 assists and 744 points in a 15-year NHL career.

Courtnall was a participant in both the second and third seasons of Battle of the Blades, the latter as a last-minute replacement for the late Wade Belak, but was eliminated early in the competition on both occasions.

Career statistics

Regular season and playoffs

International

See also
 List of family relations in the NHL
 List of NHL players with 1,000 games played

External links
 

1965 births
Living people
Battle of the Blades participants
Canadian ice hockey right wingers
Dallas Stars players
Ice hockey people from British Columbia
Ice hockey players at the 1984 Winter Olympics
Los Angeles Kings players
Montreal Canadiens players
Minnesota North Stars players
National Hockey League All-Stars
National Hockey League first-round draft picks
New York Rangers players
Olympic ice hockey players of Canada
People from Duncan, British Columbia
Toronto Maple Leafs draft picks
Toronto Maple Leafs players
Vancouver Canucks players
Victoria Cougars (WHL) players